Ben Jacobs may refer to:
 Ben Jacobs (rugby union) (born 1982), Australian rugby union player
 Ben Jacobs (American football) (born 1988), American football linebacker and coach
 Ben Jacobs (Australian rules footballer) (born 1992), Australian rules footballer
 Ben Jacobs (journalist), American journalist
 Benjamin R. Jacobs (1879–1963), American chemist
 Benjamin Jacobs (dentist) (1919–2004), dentist who survived Auschwitz
 Max Tundra, the alias of British electronic musician Ben Jacobs (born 1974)

See also
 Benjamin Jacob (1778–1829), English organist, conductor, and composer